This is a list of New Zealand Test cricketers. A Test match is an international cricket match between two of the leading cricketing nations. The list is arranged in the order in which each player won his Test cap. Where more than one player won his first Test cap in the same Test match, those players are listed alphabetically by surname.

Players
Statistics are correct as of 28 February 2023.

Notes:

See also 

 List of New Zealand ODI cricketers
 List of New Zealand Twenty20 International cricketers
 New Zealand national cricket team 
 List of New Zealand Test cricket records

External links 
 Cricinfo
 Howstat

Test
New Zealand